EcoLon (ecologically-friendly nylon) is a ceramic-glass reinforced Nylon 6 (Perlon) coating, commonly used in cookware.

Ecolon cookware coatings are touted as highly resistant to scratches caused by utensils, metallic cleaning pads and abrasives, and withstand high temperatures, leading to great durability. Teflon coatings start breaking down at 240 °C, while Ecolon remains stable up to 450 °C. EcoLon engineering resin is produced by Wellman Engineering Resins.

Ecolon ceramic coatings are a trademark of Neoflam.

See also 

 Non-stick surface

References 

Dry lubricants
Plastics
Polymers
Thermoplastics